Qala K'umu (Aymara qala stone, k'umu hunchback "stone hump", also spelled Ccalacumu, Jalacumu) is a mountain in the north of the Apolobamba mountain range in the Andes of Peru, about  high. It is located in the Puno Region, Putina Province, Ananea District, northwest of La Rinconada. Qala K'umu lies southwest of the mountains Wilaquta, Qachini and Qurwari.

References 

Mountains of Puno Region
Mountains of Peru